USS Courlan (AMc-44) was an Accentor-class coastal minesweeper acquired by the U.S. Navy for the dangerous task of removing mines from minefields laid in the water to prevent ships from passing.

The first ship to be named Courlan by the Navy, AMC-44 served in an "in service" status from 1941 to 1947.

References

External links 
 NavSource Online: Mine Warfare Vessel Photo Archive - Courlan (AMc 44)

 

Accentor-class minesweepers
World War II minesweepers of the United States
1941 ships